Dongting station may refer to:

 Dongting station (Wuhan Metro)
 Dongting station (Wuxi Metro)